Voznesensky (masculine), Voznesenskaya (feminine), or Voznesenskoye (neuter) is the name of several inhabited localities in Russia.

Urban localities
Voznesenskoye, Voznesensky District, Nizhny Novgorod Oblast, a work settlement in Voznesensky District of Nizhny Novgorod Oblast

Rural localities
Voznesensky, Mamontovsky District, Altai Krai, a settlement in Bukansky Selsoviet of Mamontovsky District of Altai Krai
Voznesensky, Tyumentsevsky District, Altai Krai, a settlement in Berezovsky Selsoviet of Tyumentsevsky District of Altai Krai
Voznesensky, Nurimanovsky District, Republic of Bashkortostan, a village in Nikolsky Selsoviet of Nurimanovsky District of the Republic of Bashkortostan
Voznesensky, Zilairsky District, Republic of Bashkortostan, a khutor in Yuldybayevsky Selsoviet of Zilairsky District of the Republic of Bashkortostan
Voznesensky, Irkutsk Oblast, a settlement in Nizhneudinsky District of Irkutsk Oblast
Voznesensky, Mari El Republic, a settlement in Znamensky Rural Okrug of Medvedevsky District of the Mari El Republic
Voznesensky, Rostov Oblast, a khutor in Voznesenskoye Rural Settlement of Morozovsky District of Rostov Oblast
Voznesensky, Stavropol Krai, a khutor in Prikalaussky Selsoviet of Petrovsky District of Stavropol Krai
Voznesensky, Tula Oblast, a settlement in Galitsky Rural Okrug of Kamensky District of Tula Oblast
Voznesensky, Udmurt Republic, a pochinok in Shaberdinsky Selsoviet of Zavyalovsky District of the Udmurt Republic
Voznesensky, Voronezh Oblast, a settlement in Voznesenskoye Rural Settlement of Talovsky District of Voronezh Oblast
Voznesenskoye, Arkhangelsk Oblast, a selo in Afanasyevsky Selsoviet of Verkhnetoyemsky District of Arkhangelsk Oblast
Voznesenskoye, Poretsky District, Chuvash Republic, a village in Semenovskoye Rural Settlement of Poretsky District of the Chuvash Republic
Voznesenskoye, Urmarsky District, Chuvash Republic, a selo in Shikhabylovskoye Rural Settlement of Urmarsky District of the Chuvash Republic
Voznesenskoye, Kaliningrad Oblast, a settlement in Prigorodny Rural Okrug of Nesterovsky District of Kaliningrad Oblast
Voznesenskoye, Khabarovsk Krai, a selo in Amursky District of Khabarovsk Krai
Voznesenskoye, Kostroma Oblast, a selo in Orekhovskoye Settlement of Galichsky District of Kostroma Oblast
Voznesenskoye, Kurgan Oblast, a selo in Voznesensky Selsoviet of Dalmatovsky District of Kurgan Oblast
Voznesenskoye, Bogorodsky District, Nizhny Novgorod Oblast, a village in Aleshkovsky Selsoviet of Bogorodsky District of Nizhny Novgorod Oblast
Voznesenskoye, Oryol Oblast, a selo in Speshnevsky Selsoviet of Korsakovsky District of Oryol Oblast
Voznesenskoye, Perm Krai, a selo in Vereshchaginsky District of Perm Krai
Voznesenskoye, Pskov Oblast, a village in Loknyansky District of Pskov Oblast
Voznesenskaya, Arkhangelsk Oblast, a village in Konevsky Selsoviet of Plesetsky District of Arkhangelsk Oblast
Voznesenskaya, Republic of Ingushetia, a stanitsa in Malgobeksky District of the Republic of Ingushetia
Voznesenskaya, Komi Republic, a village in Palauz Selo Administrative Territory of Sysolsky District of the Komi Republic
Voznesenskaya, Krasnodar Krai, a stanitsa in Voznesensky Rural Okrug of Labinsky District of Krasnodar Krai